Wood County Airport  is a county-owned, public-use airport in Wood County, Texas, United States.

Although most U.S. airports use the same three-letter location identifier for the FAA and IATA, this airport is assigned JDD by the FAA but has no designation from the IATA.

Facilities and aircraft 

For the 12-month period ending 16 September 2008, the airport had 8,700 general aviation aircraft operations, an average of 23 per day. At that time there were 29 aircraft based at this airport: 93% single-engine and 7% multi-engine.

References

External links 

  at Texas DOT airport directory
 Aerial image as of February 1995 from USGS The National Map
 

Airports in Texas
Buildings and structures in Wood County, Texas
Transportation in Wood County, Texas